McAllister House may refer to:

Pearce-McAllister Cottage, Denver, Colorado, listed on the National Register of Historic Places (NRHP)
McAllister House (Colorado Springs, Colorado), listed on the NRHP in El Paso County, Colorado
McAllister House (Seiling, Oklahoma), NRHP-listed
McAllister-Beaver House, Bellefonte, Pennsylvania, listed on the NRHP in Centre County, Pennsylvania
Archibald McAllister House, Harrisburg, Pennsylvania, listed on the NRHP in Dauphin County, Pennsylvania
James G. McAllister House, Salt Lake City, Utah, listed on the NRHP in Salt Lake City, Utah
Alexander McAllister House, Union Gap, Washington, listed on the NRHP in Yakima County, Washington